This is a list of films produced by the Tollywood film industry based in Hyderabad in 1965.

External links
 Earliest Telugu language films at IMDb.com (417 to 442)

1965
Telugu
Telugu films